Ikakogi tayrona, or the Magdalena giant glass frog, is a species of frog in the family Centrolenidae. It is endemic to the Sierra Nevada de Santa Marta, Magdalena Department, Colombia. It is the only glass frog that is known to show maternal care (in other glass frogs parental care is provided by males, if at all).

Description
Males measure  and females  in snout–vent length. The head is large and wide with snout that is rounded when viewed dorsally but sloped and truncated when viewed laterally. The color is green to pale green, and dorsal skin is granular. The males have a large humeral spine.

Reproduction
Ikakogi tayrona breed on vegetation alongside streams. Males call from the same or nearby leaves, night after night, sometimes engaging in male-male combats. Only the females have been observed to attend egg clutches. Attendance is nearly continuous during the night, whereas during the day the female may temporarily leave the clutch. Experimental removal of attending females greatly increased mortality of the eggs.

Habitat and conservation
Its natural habitats are sub-Andean forests and cloud forests where it occurs on vegetation near water. Part of the range is protected within the Sierra Nevada de Santa Marta National Natural Park and in the El Dorado Nature Reserve by Fundación ProAves. Outside the protected areas, it is threatened by habitat loss. Also pollution of water and fumigation of crops are threats.

See also 

 Ikakogi ispacue

References

Glass frogs
Amphibians of the Andes
Amphibians of Colombia
Endemic fauna of Colombia
Taxa named by John Douglas Lynch
Amphibians described in 1991
Taxonomy articles created by Polbot